This is a list of the 77 field marshals (Fältmarskalk) of Sweden, with their respective years of appointment, from the 16th to the 19th century.

See also 
 List of wars involving Sweden
 List of Swedish military commanders
 List of Swedish governors-general

References 

Field marshals
Sweden
 
Field marshals